The International Swimming Hall of Fame is a history museum and hall of fame, serving as the central point for the study of the history of swimming in the United States and around the world.

List of the members of the International Swimming Hall of Fame
List of the members of the International Swimming Hall of Fame:

References

External links
 Official ISHOF website:
List of Honorees by Name
List of Honorees by Year
List of Honorees by Category
List of Honorees by Country

Lists of swimmers
Fort Lauderdale, Florida
Sports halls of fame